Mario Valota (8 February 1918 – 30 September 2000) was a Swiss fencer. He won a bronze medal in the team épée event at the 1952 Summer Olympics.

References

External links
 

1918 births
2000 deaths
Swiss male épée fencers
Olympic fencers of Switzerland
Fencers at the 1952 Summer Olympics
Olympic bronze medalists for Switzerland
Olympic medalists in fencing
Medalists at the 1952 Summer Olympics
20th-century Swiss people